Monnecles apollinarii is a species of beetle in the family Cerambycidae, the only species in the genus Monnecles.

References

Heteropsini